There are various highways and routes in the Dominican Republic. They are built and maintained by the Ministry of Public Works and Communication (Spanish: Ministerio de Obras Públicas y Comunicaciones) or MOPC. Overall the system is centered around Greater Santo Domingo, where the country's capital is located.

According to MOPC there are 1,395 km (867 miles) of main highways, 2,412 km (1,499 miles) of secondary highways and 1,620 km (1,007 miles) of tertiary or regional highways.

Highways
The Dominican Republic is classified as a middle-income country by the World Bank. In the last 10 years the government of the Dominican Republic has put increased effort in renovating and improving the nationwide road infrastructure to improve connections of the interior of the country to Santo Domingo. This has successfully improved the quality of the main eight highways of the Dominican Republic. Expansion, widening, tunnels, and elevated viaduct have all been methods used by the Dominican authorities to increase the efficiency of the main arteries of the country. In addition, the construction of ring roads has reduced the traffic volume in urban centers, such as Santo Domingo, Santiago, San Pedro de Macorís or La Romana.

DR-1 connects Santo Domingo to the fertile Cibao region, Dominican Republic's second most populated city Santiago de los Caballeros and ends in the Dominico-Haitian border close to Monte Cristi. DR-2 gives Santo Domingo a direct link to the mid-size cities located in the southwestern region of the country and a second connection with Haiti. DR-3 provides Santo Domingo with a direct connection to the important cities of the east and to the main tourist towns of the republic. The other numbered highways provide alternative routes (DR-8, DR-4, DR-6), or work as an auxiliary route (DR-5) from the main routes to connect smaller sized cities to the main highway grid. The following is a table of the main highways of the republic.

Main highways 
MOPC has registered 1,395 km (867 miles) of main highways. They are defined as routes that bring a higher level of connection between the biggest cities and are intented for longer distances. Main highways are identified with numbers 1-9, inside a blue and red shield. According to the Ministry, there are seven main highways.

DR-1 

The first main highways, DR-1, connects Greater Santo Domingo with the Cibao valley, an area of high production. It was built in the early 20th Century during the United States occupation of the Dominican Republic (1916-1924). It is commonly known as autopista Duarte, although a section outside Santiago is named autopista Joaquín Balaguer. Originally, the highway ended at Puerto Plata, but in 1997 it was rerouted to Monte Cristi.

It connects the following municipalities: Santo Domingo, Los Alcarrizos, Pedro Brand, Villa Altagracia, Piedra Blanca, Bonao, La Vega, Puñal, Santiago de los Caballeros, Villa González, Villa Bisonó, Esperanza, Laguna Salada, Villa Vásquez, and Monte Cristi.

It has one toll located near Pedro Brand, with payment to exit Santo Domingo.

Routes
Like any developing nation, the Dominican Republic suffers from a lack of good paved routes to connect smaller towns and less populated areas. Some of them are in bad condition or are completely unpaved.

Other highways
Autopista 30 de Mayo

See also

Transport in the Dominican Republic

Further reading